Maternus or Matiernus may refer to:

Marcus Cornelius Nigrinus Curiatius Maternus (c. 40–c. 97), Roman senator and suffect consul of AD 83 
 Curiatius Maternus, who appears in Tacitus's Dialogus de oratoribus; he may be the same person as the consul of 83
Julius Maternus or Matiernus (fl. 87–90), Roman explorer of western Africa
Maternus (rebel) (fl. 187), rebel leader during the reign of Commodus
Maternus of Cologne (285–315; in legend, fl. 1st century), bishop of Trier and Cologne and Catholic saint
Maternus (bishop of Milan) (fl. 316–328), Archbishop of Milan and Catholic saint
Julius Firmicus Maternus (fl. 334–346), Latin writer, astrologer, and Christian apologist
Maternus Cynegius (fl. 381–388), praetorian prefect and consul